Aware, Inc. (NASDAQ:AWRE) is a biometrics software and services company based near Boston, Massachusetts.

History
Aware was incorporated in 1986 in Cambridge, Massachusetts at which time it was envisioned by its founders as a "mathematical engineering company".

Aware went public in 1996 to commercialize its DSL products and intellectual property, at which time it also had an established business supplying biometrics software for law enforcement applications.

Between 2009 and 2012, Aware divested several assets unrelated to its current business.

As of 2019, Aware is focused exclusively on providing biometrics software and services.  Its products apply fingerprint recognition, face recognition, iris recognition, and speaker recognition for applications including multi-factor authentication and biometric identification.

References

External links 
 Company website
 Patents by Assignee Aware, Inc.

Biometrics software
1986 establishments in Massachusetts
American companies established in 1986
Companies based in Bedford, Massachusetts
Companies listed on the Nasdaq
Software companies established in 1986
Software companies based in Massachusetts
Software companies of the United States
1996 initial public offerings